Ian Gibson (born April 7, 1963) is a Professor of Design Engineering at the University of Twente. Gibson was selected as the scientific director of Fraunhofer Project Center at the University of Twente and is a recipient of lifetime achievement award, the Freeform and Additive Manufacturing Award. His main areas of research are in at the additive manufacturing, multi-material systems, micro-RP, Rapid Prototyping, Medical Modelling and tissue engineering.

Gibson is also an editor at the Rapid Prototyping Journal and a visiting professor at Deakin University. He has co-authored over 240 articles in peer-reviewed journals and conferences.

Education
Gibson completed schooling from the Wick High School in 1979. He first completed a B.S. in the Electronic Eng in 1984 from the University of Hull in Hull, England and then received a Ph.D. in 1989 in Robotics from the University of Hull.

Career and research
Gibson began his career as an automation and robotics lecturer at the University of Nottingham. From 1994 to 2005, he was a professor at the University of Hong Kong. In 2005, Gibson moved to the National University of Singapore where he worked as an associate professor for 8 years. In 2014, Gibson joined as the professor of Industrial Design at the Deakin University in Geelong, Australia and there he initiated the university’s ‘flagship’ Centre for Advanced Design and Engineering Training (CADET). In 2018, he joined University of Twente. He is also the co-editor of the Rapid Prototyping Journal and co-founder of the Global Alliance of Rapid Prototyping Associations.

Gibson is the recipient of the FAME award for his recognition of his lifetime contribution to 3D printing. He gained recognition for his work on the prosthetic device for total joint replacement in small joint arthroplasty. He has authored book Additive Manufacturing Technologies with David Rosen, Brent Stucker, which is used as a text in the universities.

Selected publications

References

External links 
 Ian Gibson on University of Twente

1963 births
Living people
Academic staff of the University of Twente
Alumni of the University of Hull